Dudley Churchill Perkins (1915 – 25 February 1944), also known as Kiwi Perkins, was a New Zealand soldier who fought in Greece during World War II and participated in the Cretan resistance.

Perkins was born at Christchurch, Canterbury, New Zealand. Serving with the rank of Staff Sergeant in the 4th Field Regiment, New Zealand Artillery, Perkins was among the British Commonwealth troops that were evacuated to Crete after the German invasion of Greece in April 1941. He was captured by the Germans after the Battle of Crete but managed to escape in two weeks. After spending a year hiding in the mountains of Western Crete, he departed to Egypt on board a Greek submarine. During the time he spent on the island, he was impressed by the Cretans' assistance to him. Upon reaching Egypt, he joined the Special Operations Executive and returned to Crete as a SOE agent. On Crete, he was second-in-command to Major Xan Fielding. But unlike other agents who only served as liaisons, Perkins assembled his own guerrilla band and led it in many attacks against the Germans. He became known as Vasili to the Cretans and Kiwi to the British, being well-respected for his courage. Perkins was killed in a German ambush near the village of Lakkoi and is buried in Suda Bay War Cemetery.

See also 
George Psychoundakis
Sandy Rendel

References

1915 births
New Zealand military personnel of World War II
Special Operations Executive personnel
Cretan Resistance
1944 deaths
Crete in World War II
People from Christchurch
New Zealand military personnel killed in World War II
New Zealand prisoners of war in World War II
World War II prisoners of war held by Germany
New Zealand escapees
Escapees from German detention
Burials at Suda Bay War Cemetery